Jim McKay is an American film and television director, producer and writer.

He has directed episodes of The Wire, Treme, Better Call Saul, Big Love, Criminal Intent and Mr. Robot as well as writing and directing Everyday People and Angel Rodriguez.

Career
For The Wire McKay directed the fourth episode of the fourth season, "Refugees". Show runner David Simon had seen McKay's HBO films and describes them as "masterful, ordinary-life movies" and thought that McKay would be perfect for the series based on their shared characteristics of accumulating drama in small moments. McKay has worked with several cast members of the show on other projects including Reg E. Cathey and Jamie Hector on Everyday People and Wendell Pierce on Life Support.

Filmography

References

External links
 

American film directors
American television directors
Living people
Place of birth missing (living people)
Year of birth missing (living people)